Banggaidoi (Chinese: 邦格堆; Pinyin: Bānggéduī) is a township in Jomda County, Tibet Autonomous Region of China.

Notes

 

Populated places in Chamdo
Township-level divisions of Tibet